The Gwangju Football Stadium  is a football-specific stadium in Gwangju, South Korea. It is the home ground of Gwangju FC. 

The stadium holds 10,007 spectators.

History 
Originally, it was the auxiliary stadium of the Gwangju World Cup Stadium. It was remodeled in 2018 and opened on 25 July 2020 in a K League 1 match between Gwangju FC and Suwon Samsung Bluewings.

See also 
 Gwangju World Cup Stadium

References

External links
  of Gwangju FC

Sports venues in Gwangju
Football venues in South Korea
Gwangju FC
Sports venues completed in 2020
K League 1 stadiums
K League 2 stadiums
2020 establishments in South Korea